David "DeLa" LaBruyere is a musician, songwriter, and producer. He was a longtime bass guitarist for John Mayer. He has also been a member of Vigilantes of Love and worked with Michelle Malone.

References

External links
DavidLaBruyere.com

Year of birth missing (living people)
Living people
American bass guitarists
Songwriters from Louisiana
Guitarists from Louisiana
American male bass guitarists
American male songwriters